Sir Joseph Hickson (23 January 1830 – 4 January 1897) was a Canadian railway executive. He was Secretary-Treasurer, and afterwards President, of the Grand Trunk Railway Company of Canada. He was knighted by Queen Victoria 20 January 1890. He died January 4, 1897.

Family
He married Catherine Dow, daughter of Andrew Dow at Stralhearn House, Montreal, June 17, 1869. She was involved in charity work, in particular for the prevention of the spread of tuberculosis in Canada. The couple, who lived at 272 Mountain Street, Montreal, had six children, three sons and three daughters. Their eldest son, J. W. A. Hickson, Esquire, Ph.D., was a professor at McGill University.

Footnotes

References

External links
 

1830 births
1897 deaths
Canadian businesspeople
Canadian Knights Bachelor
People from Otterburn, Northumberland